Carlos Dávila López is a Puerto Rican politician from the New Progressive Party (PNP). Dávila served as member of the 21st Senate of Puerto Rico from 1997 to 2001.

Completed a Bachelor's degree in Business Administration from the University of Turabo. Served with the United States Army in the Vietnam War with the 1st Cavalry Division. Dávila was elected to the Senate of Puerto Rico in the 1996 general election to the District of Humacao, along with Luis Felipe Navas. Dávila ran for reelection at the 2000 general elections, but was defeated by the candidates of the PPD.

After that, Dávila has worked as a Legislative Aide for the President of the Senate Thomas Rivera Schatz.

See also
21st Senate of Puerto Rico

References

United States Army personnel of the Vietnam War
Living people
People from Yabucoa, Puerto Rico
Members of the Senate of Puerto Rico
United States Army soldiers
Year of birth missing (living people)